Eleanor and Franklin: The White House Years is a 1977 American made-for-television film and a sequel to Eleanor and Franklin (1976). Originally airing on March 13, 1977, it was part of a two-part biographical film directed by Daniel Petrie based on Joseph P. Lash's Pulitzer prize-winning biography, Eleanor and Franklin, chronicling the lives of the 32nd U.S. President and the first lady. Joseph Lash was a secretary and confidant of Eleanor and wrote other books on the couple.

Eleanor and Franklin focused on their respective childhoods, school years, courtship and the lead-up to his election. Seven members of the original cast returned for the sequel, including the two main characters portrayed by Jane Alexander and Edward Herrmann. It won seven Primetime Emmy Awards, including Outstanding Special of the Year. Daniel Petrie, who won Director of the Year – Special for the first installment, won the same award again. Both films were acclaimed and noted for historical accuracy.

Cast
Edward Herrmann   – Franklin D. Roosevelt (FDR), 32nd President of the United States
Jane Alexander    – Eleanor Roosevelt, 34th First Lady of the United States
Priscilla Pointer – Marguerite Missy LeHand. Long-time secretary to Franklin and considered part of the family.
Walter McGinn     – Louis Howe, intimate friend to both Roosevelts and political advisor to Franklin
Rosemary Murphy   – Sara Delano Roosevelt, Franklin's mother
Blair Brown       – Anna Roosevelt, Eleanor and Franklin's eldest child
David Healy       – Theodore Roosevelt, 26th President of the United States, uncle to Eleanor and 5th cousin to Franklin
Peggy McCay       – Grace Tully, long-time friend/secretary to Eleanor and became Franklin's top secretary after Missy died.
Donald Moffat     – Harry Hopkins, one of Franklin's closest advisers and architect of the New Deal. He was an important liaison between FDR, Winston Churchill, and Stalin meeting personally with the leaders and setting up negotiations during World War II.
Toni Darnay       – Malvina Thompson, Eleanor's personal secretary
Barbara Conrad (Barbara Smith Conrad)    – Marian Anderson, an American contralto singer. The Daughters of the American Revolution refused to allow her to perform before an integrated audience in their Constitution Hall, spurring First Lady Eleanor Roosevelt to resign from the organization and to aid in arranging for Anderson to sing from the steps of the Lincoln Memorial. Anderson went on to sing at the inaugurations of Presidents Dwight D. Eisenhower and John F. Kennedy.
Morgan Farley     – William Plog, managed the Roosevelts' Hyde Park estate
Mark Harmon     – Robert Dunlap, a soldier
Anna Lee          – Laura Delano, FDR's cousin
Linda Kelsey      – Lucy Mercer, mistress of FDR
Colin Hamilton    – Ike Hoover, Chief Usher of the White House; served both Roosevelt presidents
Ray Baker         – James Roosevelt, oldest son of the Roosevelts who served as a secretary in his father's White House and went on to become a U.S. Marine serving in World War II. He later became a Congressman from California for 10 years.
Brian Patrick Clarke – John Aspinwall Roosevelt, youngest child of the Roosevelts
Don Howard        – Elliot Roosevelt, son of the Roosevelts who served in World War II
Joseph Hacker     – Franklin D. Roosevelt Jr., son of the Roosevelts who also served in the war
Charles Lampkin   – Irvin McDuffie, FDR's African-American valet during the White House years
Arthur Gould-Porter – Sir Winston Churchill, Prime Minister of the United Kingdom
Robert Karnes     – United States Supreme Court Justice Charles Evans Hughes, frequent opponent of FDR in the courts. He also swore him in first 3 of the 4 times he was inaugurated.
David Lewis       – United States Supreme Court Justice Melville Weston Fuller, who swore in Teddy Roosevelt.
Gregory Koontz    – Curtis Roosevelt, eldest grandson of the Roosevelts; Anna's son from first marriage
Davy Muxlow       – John Roosevelt Boettiger, Roosevelt's grandson and Anna's son from second marriage

Home media
The film was released on DVD by HBO Video on May 21, 2013, with Eleanor and Franklin (1976) on the second disc.

References

External links
 

1977 television films
1977 films
ABC network original films
American sequel films
American television films
Television sequel films
Films directed by Daniel Petrie
Films about Franklin D. Roosevelt
Cultural depictions of Franklin D. Roosevelt
Cultural depictions of Eleanor Roosevelt
Cultural depictions of Theodore Roosevelt
Cultural depictions of Winston Churchill
Films scored by John Barry (composer)
1970s English-language films
1970s American films